John Douglass Wallop III (March 8, 1920 – April 1, 1985) was an American novelist and playwright.

Early life 
On March 8, 1920, Wallop was born as John Douglass Wallop III in Washington, D.C. to Marjorie Ellis Wallop and insurance agent John Douglass Wallop Jr.

Education 
Wallop graduated from the University of Maryland in 1942, where he served as editor of "The Old Line", a student-run literary and humor magazine.

Career 
His first novel, 1953's Night Light, concerns a father's search into the background of his child's murderer. Anne Brooks of the New York Herald Tribune Book Review said he "created characters who are both real and colorful, and he has delved into a maniac's mind with considerable understanding." R.G. Peck wrote an article for the Chicago Sunday Tribune and said it was the "first novel that's well constructed, carefully written, and free of painful mannerisms." Al Hine of the Saturday Review said it's a "novel that is moving and tautly interesting from the first page to last. Mr. Wallop writes fluently and without affectation, even when he is exploring the subcellars of bop."

He authored 13 works but is most famous for The Year the Yankees Lost the Pennant (1954), which was adapted by Wallop and George Abbott into the Tony Award-winning musical Damn Yankees.

Awards 
1956 Tony Award Damn Yankees
Book of the Month Club
The Year the Yankees Lost the Pennant
The Good Life
Reader's Digest Condensed Books
The Year the Yankees Lost the Pennant
So This Is What Happened to Charlie Moe

Personal life
On January 6, 1949 Wallop married writer and actress Lucille Fletcher. They remained together until his death. Wallop’s interests included chess, sailing, music, and woodworking.

Bibliography

Novels
Night Light (1953)
The Year the Yankees Lost the Pennant (also published as Damn Yankees) (1954)
The Sunken Garden (also published as The Dangerous Years) (1956)
What Has Four Wheels and Flies? A Tale (1959)
Ocean Front (1963)
So This Is What Happened to Charles Moe (1965)
The Mermaid in the Swimming Pool (1968)
The Good Life (1969)
Stone (1971)
Howard's Bag (1973)
Mixed Singles (1977)
Regatta (1981)
The Other Side of the River (1984)

Plays
Damn Yankees (musical, with George Abbott) (1955)

Nonfiction
Baseball: An Informal History (1969)

External links
Washington Post story on Wallop and Damn Yankees
 

20th-century American novelists
American male novelists
Novelists from Washington, D.C.
University of Maryland, College Park alumni
1920 births
1985 deaths
20th-century American dramatists and playwrights
American male dramatists and playwrights
20th-century American male writers
Tony Award winners